The Comedians is a 1967 American political drama film directed and produced by Peter Glenville, based on the 1966 novel of the same name by Graham Greene, who also wrote the screenplay. The stars were Richard Burton, Elizabeth Taylor, Peter Ustinov, and Alec Guinness. Paul Ford and Lillian Gish had supporting roles as a presidential candidate and wife, as did James Earl Jones as an island doctor. The role played by Elizabeth Taylor was originally intended for Sophia Loren.

Set in Haiti during the Papa Doc Duvalier regime, it was filmed in Dahomey (Benin since 1975). The film tells the story of a sardonic white hotel owner and his encroaching fatalism as he watches Haiti sink into barbarism and squalor.

Plot

A ship arrives in Port-au-Prince, Haiti. Four of the alighting passengers are: Major H. O. Jones (Alec Guinness), a British businessman with a letter of invitation to do business with the government; Mr. and Mrs. Smith (Paul Ford and Lillian Gish), an elderly American couple who wish to set up a vegetarian complex for education and nutrition for the locals; and the central character, a cynical, washed-up hotel owner named Brown, portrayed by Richard Burton.

Upon arrival, Major Jones presents his credentials to Captain Concasseur (Raymond St. Jacques), a law enforcement officer, who notices that the official who invited Jones has been deposed and imprisoned. Concasseur and his men rough up and imprison Jones.

Brown has been bequeathed a hotel in the capital from his late British mother, but has been unable to sell it in his trip to New York City. Brown also has an ongoing affair with Martha (Elizabeth Taylor), the German-born wife of the Uruguayan ambassador to Haiti, Pineda (Peter Ustinov). When Martha and Brown have an argument, Brown goes to Mere Catherine's brothel where he discovers that not only has Jones been released, but he's a guest of Captain Concasseur and is enjoying the hospitality of Brown's favourite prostitute, Marie Therese (Cicely Tyson).

Jones has gained the favour of the new regime, who are keen to receive a supply of arms. They have paid a down payment, and Jones claims the weapons are impounded in a warehouse in Miami, but the weapons may be imaginary and a confidence trick by Jones. The government will not allow Jones to leave the island until they are sure the weapons exist.

Mr. Smith, a former "Vegetarian Party" candidate for the Presidency of the United States against Harry S. Truman, is given a tour of the new capital, an empty shambles called Duvalierville. He and Mrs. Smith follow a local procession that they believe is a religious ceremony but turns out to be an audience for executions by firing squad. Captain Concasseur and his men enter Brown's hotel and beat him up until Mrs. Smith bluffs the thugs by threatening to inform her husband, the American "presidential candidate." The Smiths depart the next day.

Brown watches as the Duvalier regime seeks to put down any dissent with an iron fist. He becomes friends with Dr. Magiot (James Earl Jones), the rebel leader who was once a close friend of Brown's late mother.

As Brown becomes a reluctant participant in the planned insurrection, the rebels recruit Major Jones to provide military leadership. Jones has been regaling the other expatriates with his tales of heroism as a commando officer in the Burma Campaign that Brown does not quite believe. Brown hosts a meeting of the group, including Magiot, Jones, and Ambassador Pineda. But trouble ensues soon thereafterDuvalier’s spies from the Tonton Macoute are watching Brown’s Hotel Trianon and his every step.

When the government informs Jones that they wish to have Captain Concasseur fly to Miami to inspect the apparently fictional arms Jones wishes to sell to the regime. Jones flees to Brown's hotel. Brown is able to get Jones into the Uruguayan embassy where he pleads asylum. He escapes by dressing as Brown's female cook, wearing drag and blackface.

The day after the meeting, three assassins confront Magiot while he’s performing surgery and cut his throat with a scalpel knife.  Taking him to a rebel rendezvous in the place of Dr. Magiot, Brown suspects that Jones has become involved with Martha Pineda. The inebriated Jones makes matters worse by bragging about his conquest.

Driving carelessly up the treacherous, winding road, Brown hits an embankment and breaks the car’s front axle. On foot, they arrive at a remote cemetery, the designated meeting point. They settle in for the night with Jones admitting that his jungle war stories were total fabrication, as was his claimed conquest of Martha.  His wartime career involved running a cinema in India, and he'd never been with a woman he hadn't paid "or promised to pay."

In the morning, Captain Concasseur and one Tonton Macoute accost Brown at the cemetery. Brown denies that the Major is there, talking loudly to warn Jones. But a sleepy Jones approaches anyway. Commanded to stop, Jones turns and runs, but is killed. Brown is ordered into a jeep, but shots from rebels ring out. Concasseur and his henchman drop dead.

Asked about Jones, Brown tells the two rebels in dismay: "You arrived two minutes too late." The rebels plead with Brown to assume the role of Jones, seeing this as the only hope they have left. Brown hesitates, but relents after being asked whether he wants to continue living like this.

The three meet up with a ragtag group of poorly equipped rebels who believe that Brown is Jones. He gives a cynical, taunting speech, apparently without being understood, since the rebels speak French and he English.

The Pinedas are leaving the island. Petit Pierre (Roscoe Lee Browne), a journalist friend of Brown, tells them about a battle between government troops and rebels. He says two rebels have been killed, one "unidentified." As the plane takes off, Martha notices smoke on a hillside of the island. The question whether Brown has survived remains unanswered.

Cast
 Richard Burton as Brown
 Elizabeth Taylor as Martha Pineda
 Alec Guinness as Major Jones
 Peter Ustinov as Ambassador Pineda
 Georg Stanford Brown as Henri Philipot
 Roscoe Lee Browne as Petit Pierre
 Paul Ford as Mr. Smith
 Gloria Foster as Mrs. Philipot
 Lillian Gish as Mrs. Smith
 James Earl Jones as Dr. Magiot
 Zakes Mokae as Michel
 Douta Seck as Joseph
 Raymond St. Jacques as Captain Concasseur
 Cicely Tyson as Marie Therese

Production
Because political conditions in Haiti made filming there impossible, location shooting took place in Dahomey (now part of the Republic of Benin). Filming also took place on the Côte d'Azur in France. A short promotional documentary titled The Comedians in Africa was released in 1967 which chronicled the difficulties encountered by the on-location crew and cast. The film featured a group of black American actors who would be famous into the 1970s: Raymond St. Jacques, James Earl Jones, and Cicely Tyson. Of these stars, both Tyson and Jones would later be nominated for Academy Awards. Other black stars in the film included Zakes Mokae, Roscoe Lee Browne, Gloria Foster, and Georg Stanford Brown.

This was the final film directed by Glenville, who three years earlier directed Burton in an award-winning production of Becket.  Glenville previously directed the premier of Greene's first play, The Living Room, at Wyndham's Theatre in April 1953. 

Several of the characters were based on real people the newspaper columnist Petit Pierre for instance was based on Aubelin Jolicoeur.

Reception
The film was poorly received, despite the all-star cast. On Rotten Tomatoes it has an approval rating of 27% based on reviews from 11 critics.

Variety called the film "plodding, low-key, and eventually tedious". Roger Ebert wrote in the Chicago Sun-Times that "the movie tries to be serious and politically significant, and succeeds only in being tedious and pompous", and denounced the "long, very wordy discussions", though he conceded that "the atmosphere of the Caribbean is invoked convincingly". Bosley Crowther gave the film a mixed review, praising the atmosphere and some individual scenes, but stating: "Mr. Greene's characteristic story of white men carrying their burdens cheerlessly and with an undisguised readiness to dump them as soon as they can get away from this God-forsaken place is no great shakes of a drama. It is conventional and obvious, indeed, and is rendered no better or more beguiling by some rather superfluous additions of amorous scenes".

The film received some recognition from several critics' circles. Lillian Gish received a Golden Globe nomination for Best Supporting Actress. Paul Ford won the 1967 National Board of Review Award for Best Supporting Actor for his role as Smith, and Alec Guinness tied with Robert Shaw in A Man for All Seasons for the 1968 Kansas City Film Critics Circle Award for Best Supporting Actor for his role as Jones.

The film was not successful financially.

See also
 List of American films of 1967

References

External links
 
 
 
 

1967 films
1960s political drama films
American political drama films
Films based on works by Graham Greene
Films set in Haiti
Films shot in Benin
Films shot in France
Metro-Goldwyn-Mayer films
Films directed by Peter Glenville
Films with screenplays by Graham Greene
Films based on British novels
Films scored by Laurence Rosenthal
1967 drama films
1960s English-language films
1960s American films